The Oxi concert was a concert/Rally held on Friday 3 July 2015 in Syntagma square to support the NO vote in the 2015 Greek bailout referendum. Performers included Thanos Mikroutsikos, Vasilis Papakonstantinou, Alkinoos Ioannidis, Rita Antonopoulou, Afroditi Manou, Sokratis Malamas, Rallia Xristidou, Kostas Thomaidis, Electric Litany, Iro, Eleni Vitali and Chainides. It is estimated that more than 350,000 people attended the concert. It was broadcast live by ERT1.

The Prime minister of Greece Alexis Tsipras made a 10-minute speech.
Many Members of the Greek government and the SYRIZA party like Zoi Konstantopoulou, Nikos Pappas and Yanis Varoufakis attended the concert.

The main slogans were "For the Greece of dignity, For the Europe of democracy" and "We're writing history".

Scenes from the event were included in the documentaries Agora II:Chained and This is a Coup.

Background
After the Prime Minister declared the Referendum, 200 artists signed a declaration supporting the No vote.
The concert was organized by the performers and SYRIZA. The concert was announced for the 3 July 2015 at 7:30pm, with the organizers stating "We are giving an answer to the fear climate they want to impose, with our songs, with our loud voice". The concert started a little  after 8:30pm. It was broadcast live by the state-owned Tv station ERT1, the radio station Sto kokkino 105,5 and Ruptly.

At the same time another concert was held in Thessaloniki with Thanasis Papakonstantinou, Matoula Zamani and Giorgos Kazantzis performing.

In December 2015, the third episode of the documentary series This is a Coup which is centered around Tsipras' presence in the event, was released.

Performances

Presenter: Pasxalis Tsarouxas

Tsipras Speech

The Prime Minister of Greece Alexis Tsipras in his 10-minute speech mentioned:
...today we are not demonstrating, we are celebrating, we are celebrating democracy... ...on Sunday we aren't just deciding to remain in Europe, we are deciding to live with dignity in Europe, to live as equals in Europe... ...whatever the result may be on sunday, on Monday the greek people have nothing to divide with each other. We will fight together to build a better greece.

References

Rock concerts
2015 concerts
July 2015 events in Europe
Events in Athens